Sven Schultze (born July 11, 1978) is a retired German professional basketball player. Schultze played as both a power forward and as center. He is 2.06 m (6'9") in height and he weighs 110 kg (242 pounds). His last team was Eisbären Bremerhaven of the German League, in the 2014–15 season.

National team career
From 2000 to 2011, Schultze was a member of the German national basketball team and played 121 games with them.

References

External links
Eurobasket Profile

1978 births
Living people
Alba Berlin players
A.S. Junior Pallacanestro Casale players
Basketball players at the 2008 Summer Olympics
Brose Bamberg players
German men's basketball players
Olimpia Milano players
Olympia Larissa B.C. players
Olympic basketball players of Germany
Pallacanestro Biella players
Sportspeople from Bamberg
Power forwards (basketball)
2006 FIBA World Championship players